"Jour 1" is the debut single by French singer and actress Louane, and the lead single from her debut studio album Chambre 12.

Jour 1 is about two young lovers that just keep coming back to each other.

Charts

Weekly charts

Year-end charts

Certifications

References 

2014 debut singles
2014 songs
French-language songs
French pop songs
Mercury Records singles
Louane (singer) songs